Ingleside (also known as the William B. F. Leech House) is a historic home in Safety Harbor, Florida. It is located at 333 South Bayshore Boulevard. On April 28, 1992, it was added to the U.S. National Register of Historic Places.

References and external links
 Pinellas County listings at National Register of Historic Places
 Pinellas County listings at Florida's Office of Cultural and Historical Programs

Gallery

Houses on the National Register of Historic Places in Florida
National Register of Historic Places in Pinellas County, Florida
Houses in Pinellas County, Florida